Fontaínhas is a Portuguese hamlet located between the parishes of Balazar and Rates in Póvoa de Varzim.

Villages in Portugal